Jack Huddle (1928–1973) was an American rockabilly musician and songwriter.  He performed and recorded with Buddy Holly early in Holly's career.

Early life
Huddle was born in Paris, Texas into the family of Adrian and Velma Huddle in 1928. Twelve years later he was joined by his only sister, Judith. Even at a young age, Jack loved to sing and play the guitar. Sometimes he played on the air on radio KPLT.

At age 16, Jack got married. Soon after, he joined the Navy to serve for three years in WWII.

Music career
After his return to Paris, Jack started playing the bass fiddle in dance bands. His marriage soon broke up and his wife left with their newly born son. Jack was drafted to do his duty in Korea for ten months.

In 1953, he started working for the brand-new KDUB TV Channel 13, the local branch of CBS. He had a friendly manner and a way with children.  He hosted the children's program Children's Theater every weekday.

On an evening show once a week called Circle 13 Roundup, Jack was accompanied by a combo and sang popular western hits of the day. On this show he sometimes teamed up with Charlene Hancock, the wife of Tommy Hancock. Tommy was the owner of the infamous Cotton Club in Lubbock where Elvis and Little Richard performed. Also Clyde Hankins was asked by Jack to join him now and then. Clyde worked at the Adair musicstore in Lubbock and was known for selling Buddy Holly his first Fender Stratocaster. He also taught Buddy how to play the guitar and widened Buddy's view into musical styles other than country, especially jazz.

In 1953 Jack gave a young Buddy Holly a break when he let him perform with his friend Jack Neal as the Buddy & Jack duo on the talentshow "Around Lubbock."  For a short stint Jack even hosted a Grand Ole Opry-style show called the "G.E. Jamboree." In those years at KDUB Jack became widely known in the West Texas area and played many gigs.

On April 28, 1957, Jack made the trip to Clovis, New Mexico, together with his friend and writing partner Jim Robinson. Buddy Holly was also there or was asked by Jack to go with him. Buddy played lead guitar on the recordings made that day: "Starlight" and "Believe Me". The instrumental break on "Starlight" was often considered as one of the most catchy guitar breaks by Buddy on a non-Buddy or non-Crickets record. The session was kicked off by Jim Robinson (Jimmie Zed Robinson) singing "Whole Lot of Lovin'" and "It's a Wonderful Feeling." After that it was Huddle's turn. Jack and Jim recorded two other songs in Clovis in 1959. "Midnight Monsters Hop" and "Tarzan and Jane". Buddy didn't play on them. Jack and Jim also wrote "Frankie Frankenstein" that was recorded in Clovis and sung by Jerry Allison, Buddy Holly's drummer.

Around 1959 Jack moved to Houston. There he kept playing gigs and started working as a sales manager for a valve company.

Death
In 1973, Huddle died of a heart attack at the age of 45. His grave is located in Paris, Texas.

References

External links
 The Buddy Holly Complete Works 

People from Lubbock, Texas
Texas Tech University alumni
Buddy Holly
American rock musicians
American rock guitarists
American male guitarists
1928 births
1973 deaths
20th-century American musicians
People from Paris, Texas
Guitarists from Texas
20th-century American guitarists
20th-century American male musicians